Mario Antonio Valles Velásquez (born February 3, 1977 in Dagua, Valle del Cauca) is a male judoka from Colombia, who won the bronze medal in the men's half middleweight division (– 81 kg) at the 2003 Pan American Games in Santo Domingo, Dominican Republic. He represented his native country at two consecutive Summer Olympics, starting in 2004 in Athens, Greece.

References
  sports-reference

1982 births
Living people
Colombian male judoka
Judoka at the 2004 Summer Olympics
Judoka at the 2008 Summer Olympics
Judoka at the 2003 Pan American Games
Judoka at the 2007 Pan American Games
Olympic judoka of Colombia
Pan American Games silver medalists for Colombia
Pan American Games bronze medalists for Colombia
Pan American Games medalists in judo
South American Games silver medalists for Colombia
South American Games medalists in judo
Competitors at the 2006 South American Games
Medalists at the 2003 Pan American Games
Medalists at the 2007 Pan American Games
Sportspeople from Valle del Cauca Department
20th-century Colombian people
21st-century Colombian people